is a railway station in the city of Kariya, Aichi Prefecture, Japan, operated by Central Japan Railway Company (JR Tōkai).

Lines
Aizuma Station is served by the Tōkaidō Main Line, and is located 343.5 kilometers from the starting point of the line at Tokyo Station.

Station layout
The station has two opposed side platforms connected by a footbridge. The station building has automated ticket machines, TOICA automated turnstiles and is staffed.

Platforms

Adjacent stations

|-
!colspan=5|Central Japan Railway Company

Station history
Aizuma Station was opened on 13 March 1988.

Station numbering was introduced to the section of the Tōkaidō Line operated JR Central in March 2018; Aizuma Station was assigned station number CA59.

Passenger statistics
In fiscal 2017, the station was used by an average of 2386 passengers daily.

Surrounding area
 site of Kijō Castle
Kariya Technical High School

See also
 List of Railway Stations in Japan

References

Yoshikawa, Fumio. Tokaido-sen 130-nen no ayumi. Grand-Prix Publishing (2002) .

External links

JR-Tokai home page 

Railway stations in Japan opened in 1988
Railway stations in Aichi Prefecture
Tōkaidō Main Line
Stations of Central Japan Railway Company
Kariya, Aichi